The Jennie S. Thompkins House is a historic house at 503 N. 4th Avenue in Maywood, Illinois. The house was built circa 1872 for Jennie S. Thompkins and her husband; they purchased its plot from the Maywood Company, the original developers of Maywood. It has a gable front design, a vernacular style commonly found in working-class Chicago homes of the period. While the gable front style was also common in Maywood, the house is an especially well-preserved example of the style, as most others have since been modified or sided. The design includes a three-bay facade with segmental arched windows and a wraparound front porch that features brackets, turned posts, and a balustrade.

The house was added to the National Register of Historic Places on May 22, 1992.

References

Houses on the National Register of Historic Places in Cook County, Illinois
Vernacular architecture in the United States
Maywood, Illinois